The Accademia di belle arti is an academy of fine arts located in Reggio Calabria, Italy. It was founded in 1967.

References

External links
  

 

Art schools in Italy
Education in Calabria
Reggio Calabria
Educational institutions established in 1967
1967 establishments in Italy